Heath Hocking (born 27 December 1987) is a former professional Australian rules footballer who played for the Essendon Football Club in the Australian Football League (AFL).

Originally from Mooroolbark, he was drafted by Essendon with the 20th selection in the 2006 rookie draft from Eastern Ranges in TAC Cup. He was elevated to the main list in 2007, playing one game late in the 2007 season.

Hocking is a solid and hard-at-it midfielder, who primarily plays a defensive tagging role on opposition midfielders. He finished second in the Essendon's best and fairest award, the Crichton Medal, in 2010 and fifth in 2011.

Hocking, along with 33 other Essendon players, was found guilty of using a banned performance-enhancing substance, thymosin beta-4, as part of Essendon's sports supplements program during the 2012 season. He and his teammates were initially found not guilty in March 2015 by the AFL Anti-Doping Tribunal, but a guilty verdict was returned in January 2016 after an appeal by the World Anti-Doping Agency. He was suspended for two years which, with backdating, ended in November 2016; as a result, he served approximately fourteen months of his suspension and missed the entire 2016 AFL season.

With the retirements of Jobe Watson and Brent Stanton at the end of the 2017 AFL season, Hocking was the last player remaining on the Essendon playing list to be coached by Kevin Sheedy until he was delisted in September 2017.

References

External links

Living people
1987 births
Essendon Football Club players
Australian rules footballers from Victoria (Australia)
Eastern Ranges players
Doping cases in Australian rules football
People from Yarra Ranges